Theatrical Novel (Notes of a Dead Man), translated as Black Snow and A Dead Man's Memoir ( is an unfinished novel by Mikhail Bulgakov. Written in first-person, on behalf of a writer Sergei Maksudov, the novel tells of the drama behind-the-scenes of a theatre production and the Soviet writers' world.

Background 
In 1929, Bulgakov started working on a novella, written in the form of letters, called For Secret Friend (also unfinished), addressed to his future wife Elena Bulgakova, which explains how he "became a playwright". In 1930, For Secret Friend began to develop into a new novel, The Theatre, but in the same year he burned his initial sketches, along with rough drafts of The Master and Margarita.

Six years later and several weeks after the final break with Moscow Art Theatre, Bulgakov began writing a novel about the theatre. On the first page of the manuscript, he outlined two titles: Notes of a Dead Man and Theatrical Novel.

Summary 
The book satirizes Konstantin Stanislavski through the character Ivan Vasilievich, whose methods hinder actors' performances, reflecting Bulgakov's frustration with Stanislavski whilst attempting to stage The Cabal of Hypocrites and The Days of the Turbins (which is mentioned in the novel as Black Snow) in 1930–1936.

English translations 
 Black Snow: A Theatrical Novel, translated by Michael Glenny, Simon & Schuster , 1967. .
 A Dead Man's Memoir: A Theatrical Novel, translated by Andrew Bromfield, Penguin Classics , 2007. .
 Black Snow, translated by Roger Cockrell, Alma Books , 2014. .

References  
 

Novels by Mikhail Bulgakov
Unfinished novels
1967 novels
1936 Russian novels
Novels set in the Stalin era
Moscow Art Theatre
Novels set in Moscow
Russian novels adapted into films
Works originally published in Novy Mir